Shangombo District with headquarters at Shangombo is located in Zambia. As of the 2010 Zambian Census, the district had a population of 84, 070 people. It is important to note that this population is a combined figure with the newly created district of Sioma which was created by halving the primary district. The western part of the half retains the name Shangombo while the eastern part is called Sioma District.

The district shares boundaries with Sioma district in the south, Kalabo district in the north, Senanga district in the east (all Zambian districts) and an international boundary with Angola in the west. The district is enclosed between two major rivers, the Zambezi river and the Cuando river on the Angolan side.

The major economic activities include farming, fishing, cattle rearing/trading and tourism. All these, are done at subsistence level.

During the Angolan Civil War, the area was unsafe due to arms smuggling activities and the conflict occasionally spilled over into Zambia, where villagers were killed by combatants. A large number of Angolan refugees were placed in UNHCR camps in the district, the largest was Nangweshi Camp near the Zambezi established in 2000 for 15,000 refugees; by 2003 the district hosted about 26,000 refugees. Roads in the district may become impassable in the rainy season and vehicles can get stuck in sand during the dry season, so trucks and four-wheel drive vehicles are the principal mode of transport. Access to Mongu, the provincial capital relies on the Kalongola Ferry across the Zambezi south of Senanga, and the Senanga-Mongu road, though paved in the past has been in very poor condition, partly due to the heavy trucks used to supply UNHCR programs. The Senanga–Katima Mulilo–Sesheke dirt road is also difficult at times. Other tracks go north to Kalabo, along the eastern bank of the Cuando River and to the Sioma Ngwezi National Park located in the south of the district.

In 2003 to help supply the Nangweshi camps from Mongu, Luciano Pavarotti donated through the UNHCR a new ferry at Kalongola from the proceeds of his charity concerts, named Fernando Pavarotti in honour of his father.

Neighbouring regions in Angola and Namibia have extensive national parks and wildlife reserves. Wildlife in the district's own national park, Sioma Ngwezi has held up well despite poaching. With the end of the Angolan war tourism especially wilderness and fishing safaris may develop in Shangombo District, aided by proximity to the Trans–Caprivi Highway at Katima Mulilo just across the district's southern border.

References

Districts of Western Province, Zambia